Ray Leone is an American soccer coach.  He has coached women's soccer at six different schools and founded soccer programs at Berry College and Creighton University.

Education
Leone earned a bachelor's degree in Sociology from University of North Carolina at Charlotte.

Playing career
Leone played at UNCC while earning his degree.  Leone was a three time all-conference selection at three different positions during his playing time there.

Coaching career
Leone began his coaching career at Berry College, where he started a soccer program.  In his first year, he took the program to the national title game.  Leone is the only head coach to accomplish this feat.  The following year, Berry won the national championship under Leone's guidance.  In 1988, Leone left Berry to found at soccer program at Creighton University. In 1994 he left Creighton to become assistant coach at Clemson University.  In 1999, Leone was promoted to head coach of the Clemson women's soccer team.  Leone was promoted after his wife, Tracey Leone accepted a position to coach with the United States U-19.  After leading the Tigers to the ACC Championship in the 2000 season, Leone left for the head coaching position at Arizona State University.  Leone is Arizona State University's winning-est women's soccer coach in their history. In 2006, Leone left Arizona State for the head coaching position at Harvard University.  Leone coached at Harvard for nine seasons, leading the Crimson to five Ivy League championships.  Leone was named Ivy League Coach of the Year in 2014. In 2016, Leone resigned as Harvard coach to accept a head coaching role with the University of Maryland.  Leone stayed at Maryland for six seasons, finishing with a 27–60–18 overall record.  His contract was not renewed after the 2021 season.

Personal life
Leone is married to Tracey Leone.  The pair are both women's college soccer coaches.  As of 2014, they are the only two coaches in Division 1 college soccer who are married.  The pair have coached together at Creighton, Clemson, Arizona State, and Harvard.

References

External links
Harvard Bio
Arizona State Bio

Living people
Berry Vikings women's soccer coaches
Creighton Bluejays women's soccer coaches
Clemson Tigers women's soccer coaches
Arizona State Sun Devils women's soccer coaches
Harvard Crimson women's soccer coaches
Maryland Terrapins women's soccer coaches
Charlotte 49ers men's soccer players
American women's soccer coaches
Association footballers not categorized by position
Year of birth missing (living people)
American soccer coaches
Association football players not categorized by nationality